The 1965–66 FA Cup was the 85th staging of the world's oldest football cup competition, the Football Association Challenge Cup, commonly known as the FA Cup. Everton won the competition for the third time, beating Sheffield Wednesday 3–2 in the final at Wembley.

Matches were scheduled to be played at the stadium of the team named first on the date specified for each round, which was always a Saturday. Some matches, however, might be rescheduled for other days if there were clashes with games for other competitions or the weather was inclement. If scores were level after 90 minutes had been played, a replay would take place at the stadium of the second-named team later the same week. If the replayed match was drawn further replays would be held until a winner was determined. If scores were level after 90 minutes had been played in a replay, a 30-minute period of extra time would be played.

Calendar

Results

First round proper

At this stage clubs from the Football League Third and Fourth Divisions joined 30 non-league clubs having come through the qualifying rounds. To complete this round, Hendon and Barnet were given byes. Matches were scheduled to be played on Saturday, 13 November 1965. Seven were drawn and went to replays two, four or five days later.

Second round 
The matches were scheduled for Saturday, 4 December 1965. Four matches were drawn, with replays taking place later the same week. The Rochdale–Altrincham game was played midweek on 8 December, however.

Third round 
The 44 First and Second Division clubs entered the competition at this stage. The matches were scheduled for Saturday, 22 January 1966. Six matches were drawn and went to replays.

Fourth round 
The matches were scheduled for Saturday, 12 February 1966. Five matches were drawn and went to replays. The replays were all played two, three or four days later. The Shrewsbury Town–Carlisle United match went to a second replay on 21 February.

Fifth round 
The matches were scheduled for Saturday, 5 March 1966. Two games required replays on the following Wednesday.

Sixth round

The four quarter-final ties were scheduled to be played on 26 March 1966. Three of the four matches went to replays and the Manchester City–Everton game required a second replay to settle the tie.

Semi-finals

The semi-final matches were played on Saturday, 23 April 1966 with no replays required. Everton and Sheffield Wednesday came through the semi final round to meet at Wembley.

Final

The 1966 FA Cup final was contested by Sheffield Wednesday and Everton at Wembley on Saturday 14 May 1966. Everton were looking to become the first team since Sheffield United won in 1902 to win the cup without conceding a goal, while Sheffield Wednesday were the second Yorkshire side in succession to reach Wembley, following Leeds United’s losing appearance in the 1965 final. The match finished 3–2 to Everton.

References
General
The FA Cup Archive at TheFA.com
English FA Cup 1965/66 at Soccerbase
F.A. Cup results 1965/66 at Footballsite
Specific

 
FA Cup seasons
Fa
Eng